Merion Cricket Club is a private club which is located in Haverford, Pennsylvania. It was founded in 1865. 

The current clubhouse is its sixth, the last four having been designed by Philadelphia architect Frank Furness and his partner, Allen Evans, who was also a founder of the club.  

The club was designated a National Historic Landmark in 1987 for its leading role in the promotion, development and continued support of cricket, golf, squash, and tennis in the United States.

History
The club was founded in October 1865 by William Woodrow Montgomery and Marshall Ewing. Its first meeting was held at Glenays, the home of William Woodrow Montgomery, on December 16, 1865. While there was some thought of converting into a baseball club due to a lack of a permanent facility, its first cricket match was held in Wynnewood, Pennsylvania, May 19, 1866. 

From 1873 to 1892, the club occupied grounds in Ardmore, Pennsylvania, before moving to its present grounds in Haverford. The first tennis match was held in 1881; the first golf course was laid out in 1896, with other courses in 1912 and 1914.

Facilities

The first clubhouse (1865–73) was an existing house in Wynnewood, Pennsylvania, on land owned by Col. Owen Jones. The second (1873–80) was an industrial building in Ardmore, Pennsylvania, about a mile southeast of the current grounds. The third (1880–92), by Furness & Evans, on Cricket Avenue in Ardmore, was destroyed by fire in 1892. The fourth (1892–96), at the present location, although backing onto Montgomery Avenue, was destroyed by fire in January 1896. The fifth (1896), backing onto Grays Lane, was destroyed by fire before its completion. The sixth (and present) clubhouse was built to the same plan as the fifth but in stone and brick. Alexander Cassatt, a vice-president of the Pennsylvania Railroad (later PRR president), paid for the fireproof clubhouse.

On the club grounds there are indoor and outdoor tennis courts, paddle tennis courts, singles and doubles squash courts, a bowling alley, dining facilities and a ballroom. Seasonally, the club has croquet and cricket events.

The Club also fields a football (association football) team known as the Merion C.C. Football Club. The team competes annually for The Manheim Prize, the oldest amateur soccer trophy in the United States.

The Club's tennis and squash facilities have been host to many historically significant national and international championships.

Merion Golf Club 
In 1896 members of the Merion Cricket Club founded the Merion Golf Club which has hosted the U.S. Open five times, for the first time in 1934. In 1941, this became a separate club. The Merion Golf Club most recently hosted the U.S. Open in 2013.

Gallery

See also
Philadelphia Cricket Club
Germantown Cricket Club
Belmont Cricket Club
List of National Historic Landmarks in Pennsylvania

References

External links

Merion Cricket Club at Historic American Buildings Survey 

American club cricket teams
Sports clubs established in 1865
Sports in Pennsylvania
Lower Merion Township, Pennsylvania
Colonial Revival architecture in Pennsylvania
Victorian architecture in Pennsylvania
Frank Furness buildings
National Historic Landmarks in Pennsylvania
Buildings and structures in Montgomery County, Pennsylvania
1865 establishments in Pennsylvania
History of Pennsylvania
National Register of Historic Places in Montgomery County, Pennsylvania
National Register of Historic Places in Delaware County, Pennsylvania
Cricket in Pennsylvania
1939 International Lawn Tennis Challenge